Duttaphrynus atukoralei (common names: Yala toad, Atukorale's dwarf toad) is a species of toad in the family Bufonidae. It is endemic to Sri Lanka where it is found on the coastal lowlands of southern half of Sri Lanka below  asl.

Etymology
The specific name atukoralei honors Mr. Vicky Atukorale, a Sri Lankan naturalist who collected the holotype .

Habitat and conservation
D. atukoralei is a terrestrial toad found in wet evergreen tropical forests, dry lands, and areas of human habitation. It is a common species, and more common in areas outside primary forests. It is facing no major threats.

References

atukoralei
Frogs of Sri Lanka
Endemic fauna of Sri Lanka
Amphibians described in 1966
Taxonomy articles created by Polbot